The 2015 Formula Renault 2.0 Northern European Cup was the tenth Formula Renault 2.0 Northern European Cup season, an open-wheel motor racing series for emerging young racing drivers based in Europe.

Drivers and teams

Race calendar and results
The seven-event provisional calendar for the 2015 season was released on 19 November 2014.

Championship standings
Points system
Points were awarded to the top 20 classified finishers.

Drivers' championship
The second race at Spa-Francorchamps was red-flagged after four laps of the race had been completed due to torrential rain. As a result, series organisers awarded half points to each of the classified finishers eligible to score points.

Teams' championship
The second race at Spa-Francorchamps was red-flagged after four laps of the race had been completed due to torrential rain. As a result, series organisers awarded half points to each of the classified finishers eligible to score points.

References

External links
 Official website of the Formula Renault 2.0 NEC championship

NEC
Formula Renault 2.0 NEC
Formula Renault 2.0 NEC
Renault NEC